St. Paul's Catholic Church or St. Paul Catholic Church or St. Paul Roman Catholic Church or St. Paul's Roman Catholic Church may refer to:

St. Paul Catholic Church (Highland, Illinois),
St. Paul's Catholic Church (Burlington, Iowa) 
St. Paul's Catholic Church (Birmingham, Alabama), listed on the NRHP in Alabama
St. Paul Cathedral-Catholic, St. Paul, MN, listed on the NRHP in Minnesota
St. Paul Catholic Church (Center, Missouri), listed on the NRHP in Missouri
St. Paul's Roman Catholic Church (New Bern, North Carolina), listed on the NRHP in North Carolina
St. Paul's Catholic Church (San Francisco)
St. Paul's Catholic Church and Rectory, Sharpsburg, OH, listed on the NRHP in Ohio

St. Paul Roman Catholic Church (St. Paul, Oregon), listed on the NRHP in Oregon
St. Paul's Catholic Church (Portsmouth, Virginia), listed on the NRHP in Virginia
Saint Paul Catholic Church (Ellicott City, Maryland)

See also
St. Paul's Church (disambiguation)